F.E.E.L.I.N.G.C.A.L.L.E.D.L.I.V.E is a live concert video released by Pulp in October 1996, following the success of their album Different Class. The title is a reference to the band's song "F.E.E.L.I.N.G.C.A.L.L.E.D.L.O.V.E". The whole concert was later included on the Ultimate Live DVD.

Track listing 
"Do You Remember the First Time?"
"Monday Morning"
"Pencil Skirt"
"I Spy"
"Sorted for E's & Wizz"
"Something Changed"
"Live Bed Show"
"Acrylic Afternoons"
"Babies"
"Disco 2000"
"Mis-Shapes"
"F.E.E.L.I.N.G.C.A.L.L.E.D.L.O.V.E"
"Underwear"
"Common People"

Sources 
AcrylicAfternoons
"Truth and Beauty: the Story of Pulp" by Mark Sturdy (Omnibus Press)

Pulp (band) video albums
1996 live albums
1996 video albums
Live video albums